Roman Aleksandrovich Chernyshyov (born 24 July 1987) is a former Russian professional football player.

Club career
He made his Russian Football National League debut for FC Oryol on 1 April 2006 in a game against FC Salyut-Energiya Belgorod. That was his only season in the FNL.

External links
 

1987 births
People from Ramensky District
Living people
Russian footballers
FC Oryol players
Association football midfielders
FC Amkar Perm players
FC Saturn Ramenskoye players
FC Chernomorets Novorossiysk players
FC Salyut Belgorod players
FC Sportakademklub Moscow players
Sportspeople from Moscow Oblast